Mario Panzeri (11 October 1911 – 19 May 1991) was an Italian lyricist and composer. He is well known for his composed songs that include "Maramao perché sei morto?"  "Pippo non lo sa", "Lettera a Pinocchio", and "Grazie dei fior", which won the first edition of the Sanremo Music Festival in 1951.

Panzeri was the composer of Sanremo Music Festival 1964 winning song "Non ho l'età".

Life and career 
Born in Milan, Panzeri started his career as a revue actor and singer. He began composing songs in the second half of the 1930s, having large success with two songs, "Maramao perché sei morto?" and "Pippo non lo sa", which also raised some controversies as they were accused of mocking some important Fascist personalities (Costanzo Ciano and Achille Starace, respectively). In 1951 a song he composed, "Grazie dei fior", won the first edition of the Sanremo Music Festival. In 1959 his song "Lettera a Pinocchio" was presented at the first edition of the Zecchino d'Oro and later became a hit thanks to the version by Johnny Dorelli.

In the 1960s Panzeri started a successful collaboration with  Daniele Pace and his songs contributed to launch the careers of notable singers such as Gigliola Cinquetti, for whom he composed the Eurovision Song Contest 1964 and Sanremo Music Festival 1964 winning song "Non ho l'età", Caterina Caselli, for whom he wrote the hit "Nessuno mi può giudicare", and Orietta Berti, for whom he composed most of her 1960s-1970s repertoire.

References

External links

 

 

1911 births
1991 deaths
Musicians from Milan
Italian songwriters
Italian lyricists
Male songwriters
20th-century Italian male musicians